Anandha Kanneer is a 1986 Indian Tamil-language drama film directed by K. Vijayan. Based on the play Puthiyathor Ulagam Seivom by Bharath, the film stars Sivaji Ganesan and Lakshmi. It was released on 7 March 1986.

Plot 
The story deals with the troubles faced by the honest upright protagonist , Kalyanaraman Iyer in solemnizing the arranged marriage of his last daughter. Troubles not only of Dowry from the prospective in-laws but also his own daughter-in-law breaking their joint family taking away the support of earning elder son considering Kalyanaraman Iyer is retired now. To add to his woes, his second son, who just got a job enters into inter-religion marriage forcing them to ignore him for this would add complications to his own daughter's marriage. Above all, the third son is jobless and quick to anger too. Trying to navigate through the myriad of complications, Kalyanaraman Iyer sells his kidney for money to solemnize the marriage prompting the broken family to reunite at the hospital bed.

Cast 

Sivaji Ganesan as Kalyanaraman Iyer
Lakshmi as Parvatham
Jayashree as Radha
Visu as Paapa
V. K. Ramasamy as Damodar
Major Sundarrajan as Urology doctor
Thengai Srinivasan as Lady Krishna Iyer
Rajeev as Anantharama Iyer, the eldest son of Kalyanarama Iyer
Nizhalgal Ravi as Kalyanarama Iyer second son.
Ravi Raghavendra as Raghu, Kalyanarama Iyer third son
Rajalakshmi
J. Lalitha as Arockiyaraj mary
Devi Lalitha as Manju
Vennira Aadai Moorthy
Janagaraj
Oru Viral Krishna Rao
Subbini
Senthil as Barber
 T. K. S. Natarajan as Car driver
 S.R. Veeraraghavan
MLA Thangaraj

Soundtrack 
Soundtrack was composed by Shankar–Ganesh.

Reception 
Jeyamanmadhan of Kalki called it a good family story after a long time.

References

External links 
 

1980s Tamil-language films
1986 drama films
1986 films
Films directed by K. Vijayan
Films scored by Shankar–Ganesh
Indian drama films
Indian films based on plays